The 1973–74 Toronto Toros season was the team's first season in Toronto, as they spent their inaugural season as the Ottawa Nationals in 1972–73.

Offseason
The Nationals were moved to Toronto and sold to John F. Bassett, son of former Toronto Maple Leafs part owner John Bassett.  The new owner renamed team the Toros, as its short for Toronto, and it is also a Spanish bull.  To attract attention, Bassett signed 18-year-old Toronto Marlboros star Wayne Dillon, and former Maple Leafs defenseman Carl Brewer to anchor the blueline.  The Toros also thought they had a deal to sign Maple Leafs star player Darryl Sittler to a five-year, $1 million contract, however, Sittler decided to return to the Leafs.

The Toros originally planned to move the team into a renovated CNE Coliseum, while Bill Ballard, the son of Maple Leafs owner Harold Ballard and was running Maple Leaf Gardens due to his father being in prison, was opposed of the renovation and wanted the team to play in the Gardens.  The Toros decided to spend the season at Varsity Arena, which seated 4,860 fans.

As the Ottawa Nationals the previous season, the team finished in fourth place in the Eastern Division with a 35-39-4 record, losing to the New England Whalers in the first round of the playoffs.

Regular season
The first game for the Toros was played on October 7, 1973, at Varsity Arena, with Toronto tying the Chicago Cougars 4-4.  The Toros would get off to a sluggish start, going 0-2-2 in their first four games before defeating the Los Angeles Sharks 3-0 on the road.  The team continued to slump, and through their first twelve games, sat with a record of 2-7-3.  Toronto would break out of their slump though, and post a record of 17-11-0 in their next 28 games to go over the .500 for the first time.  The Toros would keep up their great play, and end the season in second place in the Eastern Division, with a 41-33-4 record, earning 86 points, which was a twelve-point improvement over the previous season.  Head coach Billy Harris won the Howard Baldwin Trophy, presented to the Coach of the Year.

Offensively, Toronto was led by Wayne Carleton, who finished with a team high 37 goals and 92 points and finished sixth in league scoring.  Gavin Kirk had another solid season, earning 68 points in 78 games, while rookie Wayne Dillon earned 65 points in 71 games.  The defense was led by Brian Gibbons, who had 35 points, while Carl Brewer chipped in with 25 points.  Rick Cunningham led the Toros with 88 penalty minutes.

In goal, Gilles Gratton had the majority of playing time, winning 26 games while posting a GAA of 3.53, along with two shutouts.  Les Binkley backed him up, winning 14 games with a team best 3.27 GAA, and a shutout.

Season standings

Game log

Playoffs
The Toros opened the playoffs in a best of seven series against the Cleveland Crusaders, who finished in third place in the Eastern Division, three points behind Toronto.  The series opened at Varsity Arena, with the Toros shutting out the Crusaders 4-0 in the series opener, followed by a close 4-3 victory in the second game to take a 2-0 series lead.  The series shifted to Cleveland for the next two games, however, the Toros took the third game 4-2 to put the Crusaders on the brink of elimination.  Cleveland managed to avoid being eliminated in the fourth game, winning 3-2 in overtime, however, the series returned to Toronto for the fifth game, with the Toros winning 4-1 to take the series in five games.

Next up for Toronto was the Chicago Cougars, who finished in fourth place in the Eastern Division, five points behind the Toros.  The Cougars defeated the first place New England Whalers in seven games to advance to the Divisional Finals.  The series opened in Toronto, and the Toros took an early series lead with a 6-4 victory in the first game.  The Cougars would win the second game 4-3 to even the series up.  The series moved to Chicago for the next two games, and the Cougars took a 2-1 series lead with a 3-2 victory in the third game, however, the Toros won a wild fourth game by a 7-6 score to even the series up again.  In the fifth game in Toronto, the Toros took care of the Cougars 5-3 to go up 3-2 in the series.  Back in Chicago for the sixth game, the Cougars fought off elimination, easily defeating Toronto by a 9-2 score, setting up a seventh and final game at Varsity Arena.  Chicago would upset the favoured Toros, winning the game 5-2 to advance to the Avco Cup finals, ending Toronto's season.

Toronto Toros 4, Cleveland Crusaders 1

Chicago Cougars 4, Toronto Toros 3 - Semifinals

Player stats

Regular season
Scoring leaders

Goaltending

Playoff stats
Scoring leaders

Goaltending

Awards and records

Draft picks
Toronto's draft picks at the 1973 WHA Amateur Draft.

See also
 1973–74 WHA season

References

SHRP Sports
The Internet Hockey Database
Toronto Toros Attendance Figures (Archived 2009-10-21)

Toronto
Toronto
Toronto Toros seasons